Wang Won is a tambon (sub-district) in the Phrom Phiram District of Phitsanulok Province, Thailand.

Geography
Wang Won lies in the Nan Basin, which is part of the Chao Phraya Watershed.

Administration
The following is a list of the sub-district's muban, which roughly correspond to the villages:

References

Tambon of Phitsanulok province
Populated places in Phitsanulok province